Grevillea brachystachya, commonly known as short-spiked grevillea, is a species of flowering plant in the family Proteaceae and is endemic to the south-west of Western Australia. It is a bushy shrub with linear leaves and more or less spherical clusters of cream-coloured to greenish flowers.

Description

Taxonomy
Grevillea brachystachya was first formally described in 1848 by Carl Meissner in Johann Georg Christian Lehmann's Plantae Preissianae from specimens collected by James Drummond in the Swan River Colony. The specific epithet (brachystachya) means "short flower spike".

Distribution and habitat
Short-spiked grevillea usually grows in woodland or shrubland and is found in scattered populations between Miling, Wongan Hills and the Murchison River in the Avon Wheatbelt, Geraldton Sandplains and Yalgoo biogeographic regions of south-western Western Australia.

Conservation status
Grevillea brachystachya is listed as "not threatened" by the Department of Biodiversity, Conservation and Attractions.

References

brachystachya
Proteales of Australia
Eudicots of Western Australia
Taxa named by Carl Meissner
Plants described in 1848